Adolf Horion (12 July 1888, in Hochneukirch – 28 May 1977, in Überlingen) was a German entomologist who specialised in Coleoptera.

Major works 
 Nachtrag zu FAUNA GERMANICA, Die Käfer des Deutschen Reiches von Edmund Reitter, Hans Goecke Verlag, Krefeld 1935
 Faunistik der Mitteleuropäischen Käfer, Bd. I, Adephaga - Caraboidea., Kommissionsverlag Goecke, Krefeld 1941
 Faunistik der Mitteleuropäischen Käfer, Bd. II, Klostermann, Frankfurt 1949
 Käferkunde für Naturfreunde, Klostermann, Frankfurt 1949
 Verzeichnis der Käfer Mitteleuropas, Alfred Kernen Verlag, Stuttgart 1951
 Faunistik der Mitteleuropäischen Käfer, Bd. III, Malacodermata, Sternoxia (Elateridae - Throscidae)., Eigenverlag Museum Frey, München 1953
 Faunistik der Mitteleuropäischen Käfer, Bd. IV, Sternoxia (Buprestidae), Fossipedes, Macrodactylia, Brachymera., Eigenverlag Museum Frey, Tutzing bei München 1955
 Faunistik der Mitteleuropäischen Käfer, Bd. V, Heteromera, Tutzing 1956
 Faunistik der Mitteleuropäischen Käfer, Bd. VI, Lamellicornia, Kommissionsverlag Buchdruckerei Aug. Feyel 1958
 Faunistik der Mitteleuropäischen Käfer, Bd. VII, Clavivornia, 1. Teil, (Sphaeritidae bis Phalacridae)., Kommissionsverlag Buchdruckerei Aug. Feyel 1960
 Faunistik der Mitteleuropäischen Käfer, Bd. VIII, Clavicornia II, Verlagsdruckerei PH. C. W. Schmidt, Neustadt a. d. Aisch 1961
 Faunistik der Mitteleuropäischen Käfer, Bd. IX, Staphylinidae, 1. Teil Micropeplinae bis Euaesthetinae, Kommissionsverlag Buchdruckerei Aug. Feyel 1963
 Faunistik der Mitteleuropäischen Käfer, Bd. X, Staphylinidae, 2. Teil Paederinae bis Staphylininae, Verlagsdruckerei PH. C. W. Schmidt, Neustadt a. d. Aisch 1965
 Faunistik der Mitteleuropäischen Käfer, Bd. XI, Staphylinidae, 3. Teil Habrocerinae bis Aleocharinae (ohne Subtribus Athetae), Verlagsdruckerei PH. C. W. Schmidt, Neustadt a. d. Aisch 1967
 Faunistik der Mitteleuropäischen Käfer, Bd. XII, Cerambycidae, Verlagsdruckerei PH. C. W. Schmidt, Neustadt a. d. Aisch 1974
 A. M. J. Evers, W. Lucht (Hrsg.): Adolf Horion. Opera coleopterologica e periodicis collata., Goecke & Evers, Krefeld, 1983.

References 
 Adolf Horion: Autobiographie. Mitt. Arb. gem. Rhein. Koleopterologen (Bonn) 3(2), 1993, 75-89

German entomologists
1977 deaths
1888 births
20th-century German zoologists